If It's Tuesday, This Must Be Belgium is a 1969 American DeLuxe Color romantic comedy film made by Wolper Pictures and released by United Artists. It was directed by Mel Stuart, was filmed on location throughout Europe, and features many cameo appearances from various stars. The film stars  Suzanne Pleshette, Ian McShane, Mildred Natwick, Murray Hamilton, Sandy Baron, Michael Constantine, Norman Fell, Peggy Cass, Marty Ingels, Pamela Britton, and Reva Rose.

Synopsis
Charlie (McShane) is an amorous English tour guide who takes groups of Americans on whirlwind 18-day sightseeing tours of Europe. Among his various clients on his latest trip are Samantha (Pleshette), with whom he wants to have an affair; a man who desires a pair of custom-made Italian shoes from a certain cobbler in Rome; another man (Baron), who is secretly being set up for a surprise marriage with his Italian cousin; and an army veteran (Constantine) who is reliving his World War II experiences.

Production
The title, also used by a 1965 documentary on CBS television that filmed one such tour, was taken from a New Yorker cartoon by Leonard Dove. Published in the June 22, 1957, issue of the magazine, the cartoon depicts a young woman near a tour bus and a campanile, frustratedly exclaiming "But if it's Tuesday, it has to be Siena," thereby humorously illustrating the whirlwind nature of European tour schedules. This concept formed the premise of the film's plot. Donovan sings "Lord of the Reedy River," which he had also written. He also wrote the film's title song, performed by J.P. Rags. J.P. Rags is a pseudonym for Douglas Cox.

Locations
Locations where the film was shot include first: London, Great Britain;  second: the Netherlands; third: Brussels and Bastogne, Belgium; fourth: Rhineland-Palatinate with the boat on the Rhine from Koblenz to Wiesbaden, Germany; fifth: Switzerland; and last: Venice and Rome, Italy. The film poster shows the cast on the normally pedestrianized Grote Markt square of Antwerp, Belgium, posing for a typical souvenir photo in front of the city hall, with their tour bus obstructing the view of the Brabo fountain which is normally a favorite photo-op with other tourists.

Cast

Main

 Suzanne Pleshette as Samantha Perkins
 Ian McShane as Charlie Cartwright
 Mildred Natwick as Jenny Grant
 Murray Hamilton as Fred Ferguson
 Sandy Baron as John Marino
 Michael Constantine as Jack Harmon
 Norman Fell as Harve Blakely
 Peggy Cass as Edna Ferguson
 Marty Ingels as Bert Greenfield
 Pamela Britton as Freda
 Reva Rose as Irma Blakely
 Aubrey Morris as Harry Dix
 Hilarie Thompson as Shelly Ferguson
 Luke Halpin as Bo
 Mario Carotenuto as Giuseppe
 Patricia Routledge as Mrs. Featherstone
 Marina Berti as Gina
 Ermelinda De Felice as Italian Woman in Automobile Accident (as Linda De Felice)
 Paul Esser as German Sergeant
 Jenny White as Dot

Cameo appearances

 Senta Berger
 John Cassavetes
 Joan Collins
 Vittorio De Sica
 Donovan singing "Lord of the Reedy River"
 Sonya Doumen
 Anita Ekberg
 Ben Gazzara
 Virna Lisi
 Elsa Martinelli
 Catherine Spaak
 Robert Vaughn

Reception

Box office
If It's Tuesday, This Must Be Belgium earned estimated rentals of $3 million in the United States during its initial run.

Critical response
Vincent Canby of The New York Times wrote in his review: "IF IT'S TUESDAY, This Must Be Belgium may be the first cartoon caption ever made into a feature-length movie. If I remember correctly, that was the legend that appeared some years ago under a New Yorker Magazine cartoon showing two harried American travelers, in the middle of a relentlessly picturesque village, consulting their tour schedule. It was a nice cartoon, made timely by the great wave of tourism that swept Europe in the 1950s. Subsequently, I'm told, there was a television documentary that explored more or less this same phenomenon—the boom in pre-paid (two in a room), packaged culture junkets. Now, some years after the subject seemed really fresh, a movie has been made about one such 18-day, 9-country excursion. Even if you don't accept the fact that just about everything that could be said about American tourism was said earlier by Mark Twain, Henry James or even Woody Allen, If It's Tuesday, This Must Be Belgium is a pretty dim movie experience, like a stopover in an airport where the only reading matter is yesterday's newspapers."

Roger Ebert wrote in his review: "Someone -- Mark Twain? -- once said that the American tourist believes English can be understood anywhere in the world if it's spoken loudly and slowly enough. To this basic item of folklore, other characteristics of the typical American tourist have been added from year to year: He wears sunglasses, Bermuda shorts and funny shirts. He has six cameras hanging around his neck. He orders hamburgers in secluded little Parisian restaurants. He talks loudly, and the female of his species is shrill and critical. He is, in short, a plague. This sort of American tourist does still exist, but in much smaller numbers. My observation during several visits to Europe is that the American tourist has become poorer and younger than he used to be, and awfully self-conscious about being an American. On the average, he's likely to be quieter and more tactful than the average German or French tourist (who doesn't have to prove anything). The interesting thing about If It's Tuesday, This Must Be Belgium is that it depicts this new American tourist. That's amazing because movies of this sort usually tend to be 10 years behind the times, and I went expecting another dose of the Bermuda shorts syndrome. "If It's Tuesday" isn't a great movie by any means, but it manages to be awfully pleasant. I enjoyed it more or less on the level I was intended to, as a low-key comedy presenting a busload of interesting actors who travel through England, Belgium, Germany, and Italy on one of those whirlwind tours. There is a lot of scenery, but not too much, and some good use of locations in Venice and Rome. There are also some scenes that are better than they should be because they're well-acted. Murray Hamilton is in a lot of these scenes, and they're reminders that he has been in a disproportionate number of the best recent comedies: The President's Analyst, Two for the Road, and The Graduate (he was Mr. Robinson)."

Remake
If It's Tuesday, This Must Be Belgium was remade in 1987 as a made-for-TV movie titled If It's Tuesday, It Still Must Be Belgium directed by Bob Sweeney. The film starred Claude Akins, Lou Liberatore, Courteney Cox, Bruce Weitz,  Stephen Furst, Anna Maria Horsford, Kene Holliday. Kiel Martin, David Leisure, Doris Roberts, Tracy Nelson, Richard Moll, David Oliver, Lou Jacobi, and Peter Graves.

Release
If It's Tuesday, This Must Be Belgium was released in theatres on April 24, 1969.

Home media
The film was released on DVD on May 20, 2008. Olive Films released a Blu-Ray edition in 2016.

See also
 List of American films of 1969

References

External links
 
 
 
 
 NY Times Review
 

1969 films
1969 romantic comedy films
American romantic comedy films
1960s English-language films
Films about vacationing
Films directed by Mel Stuart
Films scored by Walter Scharf
Films set in Belgium
Films set in West Germany
Films set in Italy
Films set in the Netherlands
Films set in Switzerland
Films set in London
Films set in Rome
Films set in Venice
American road movies
The Wolper Organization films
United Artists films
1960s American films